Birding World was a monthly birding magazine published in the United Kingdom. It was the magazine of the Bird Information Service, based at Cley next the Sea, Norfolk. With the publication of issue No. 26/12 in January 2014, Birding World magazine ceased publication.

History and profile
Originally published in 1987 as Twitching volume 1, the magazine underwent a name-change to this name, in 1988 (also resetting its volume count back to 1). The editor was Steve Gantlett, and the assistant editor Richard Millington.

It was aimed at birders with an interest in the occurrence and identification of rare birds in the United Kingdom and the Western Palearctic. It also covered birding-related material from around the globe.

The range of material published included:

 papers on bird identification, often including proposed new identification characters for difficult groups of taxa
 news articles on rare birds in Britain and elsewhere in the Western Palearctic

Significant articles published included:

 A three-part series by Krister Mild on the identification of Western Palearctic black-and-white flycatchers
 A number of papers on the Feas's/Zino's petrel group
 An identification paper on booted, Sykes', western olivaceous and eastern olivaceous warblers

In 2004, its circulation was estimated at 4000 copies.

See also
 List of journals and magazines relating to birding and ornithology

References

External links
 Birding World
 

1987 establishments in the United Kingdom
2014 disestablishments in the United Kingdom
Monthly magazines published in the United Kingdom
Defunct magazines published in the United Kingdom
Journals and magazines relating to birding and ornithology
Magazines established in 1987
Magazines disestablished in 2014
Mass media in Norfolk